Delano Davis (born 7 January 1995) is a Bahamian sprinter. He was born on Abaco Island, and attended Sunland Baptist Academy in Freeport, Bahamas. He would later go on to compete for Essex County College and LIU Brooklyn. 

He won a gold medal in the 100 metres at the 2011 CARIFTA Games.

References

External links

1995 births
Living people
Bahamian male sprinters
People from Abaco Islands